The 1987 Victorian Football Association season was the 106th season of the top division of the Australian rules football competition, and the 27th season of second division competition. The Division 1 premiership was won by the Springvale Football Club, after it defeated Port Melbourne in the Grand Final on 20 September by 38 points; it was Springvale's first Division 1 premiership, won in just its fourth season in the first division. The Division 2 premiership was won by Prahran; it was the club's second Division 2 premiership, and the last premiership ever won by the club in either division.

The 1987 season was tumultuous on and off the field, with three separate clubs – Moorabbin, Geelong West and Caulfield – suspended from the Association at different times during the year.

FORT review
In mid-1986, the Association organised the Football Organisation Review Team (FORT), which was tasked with reviewing the medium and long term structure of the Association and how it would fit within the wider Victorian football landscape. The FORT comprised: Association president and former Brunswick president Brook Andersen; former Association and Brunswick president Cr Alex Gillon;  CEO and former National Football League consultant John Adams; with consultation from state Minister for Sports and Recreation and former  player Neil Trezise MLA. The FORT was given carte blanche to review how best to structure the Association into the future.

Context
The Association, particularly its weakest clubs, had been in decline for about a decade, struggling with the Victorian Football League entering the Sunday football market, rising costs, loss of television coverage, reduced access to former League players, and demographic shifts in former heartland municipalities. The Association had been working since 1980 to improve its overall viability, having discussed various affiliation models with the League in 1980, and undergone restructures of the divisional system in both 1982 and 1984, but about half of the Association's clubs were still struggling and long-term viability was a concern to the Association executive.

The Victorian Football League was also going through dramatic changes which were altering the wider football landscape in Victoria. In October 1986, the League admitted newly established clubs based in Perth (the West Coast Eagles) and south-eastern Queensland (the Brisbane Bears). Thereafter followed wide speculation about further national expansion of the VFL, with expressions of interest from private consortiums, leagues and clubs in Adelaide, Canberra, Fremantle and Tasmania, and speculation that the struggling Victorian clubs would relocate, merge or fold. As such, the future composition of the League was very uncertain at the time, but it was considered realistic that within only a few years, the League could have expanded to a fully national competition, with a reduction in the number of Victorian-based clubs competing.

FORT recommendations

The FORT concluded that with the potential rapid nationalisation of the League, the Association would be well placed to take the position as the top state-based competition in Victoria, sitting underneath the League and serving as a development ground and reserves competition for its Victorian clubs – similar to how the West Australian Football League was organised underneath the West Coast Eagles. To do this effectively, the Association would be best structured as a single division of twelve strong, viable clubs, with promotion and relegation abandoned permanently. The FORT named its twelve clubs, based upon a number of off-field criteria including tradition, location, quality of facilities, and level of support from locals, councils and sponsors. The twelve clubs named were: from Division 1, Box Hill, Coburg, Frankston, Geelong West, Port Melbourne, Preston, Sandringham and Williamstown; from Division 2, Dandenong, Oakleigh and Prahran; and a new club based in Ringwood. Under the proposal, the second division would continue, but it would now be a suburban league operating under the auspices of the Victorian Metropolitan Football League, with no prospects of promotion to Division 1. The eleven clubs who were excluded from the FORT's vision were: Division 1 clubs Brunswick and Springvale; and Division 2 clubs Berwick, Camberwell, Caulfield, Moorabbin, Mordialloc, Northcote, Sunshine, Waverley and Werribee.

The FORT sought to implement this change by 1988, but needed a three-quarters majority from a vote of the Board of Management to achieve a formal mandate, which would have required several of the excluded clubs would vote in favour of their own exclusion. Springvale, which was undergoing the strong recruiting campaign which ultimately delivered it the 1987 premiership, and Sunshine, which had enjoyed a resurgence in recent years was in the process of securing $350,000 from the council to upgrade Skinner Reserve, were both worried that the uncertainty generated by the FORT recommendations might jeopardise those ventures, so those clubs led the public campaign against the changes; within a fortnight, they claimed to have thirteen clubs onside to oppose the changes. By April 1987, Andersen recognised that he did not have enough support to get the changes through, and it was never formally put to the vote.

The FORT also recommended that the Association's Board of Management, which was the primary decision-making body within the Association, be restructured. Since the Association's foundation, the Board had been formed from club delegates, the consequence being that the Association could pass changes only if a majority of clubs voted for them.  The FORT recommended an independent board comprising five delegates: three elected by Division 1 clubs, one elected by Division 2 clubs, and one from the VFL Commission. This would allow the Board to make more difficult decisions in the interest of the Association as a whole, rather than rely on clubs who could vote down changes on self-interest. The motion for an independent board was put to the vote on 5 May 1987, and fell one vote short of the three-quarters majority it required, with 17–7 in favour. A second vote was held in July, with the size of the proposed board expanded to six, but it this time it was comfortably voted down by a 10–14 margin. The independent board of management was eventually approved in March 1988.

Aftermath
Although the FORT's structural recommendations were never formally mandated, eight clubs left or were forced out of the Association within only 2½ years of the review, with most of those clubs placing part of the blame on the fall-out from the FORT review. Andersen and the rest of the Association executive made it clear that they were still strategically in favour of the FORT's vision, which created uncertainty about whether the second division had a future: Berwick and Mordialloc both saw this uncertainty as reason to withdraw from the Association and return to suburban football; and players and sponsors saw this uncertainty as a reason to abandon weaker clubs, severely affecting clubs like Caulfield. Many clubs also expressed bitterness upon their departures that they felt that the Association executive became more willing to allow weaker clubs to decline and fail without intervening, in order to allow the Association to progress naturally towards the FORT's vision.

Within only six years, the Association had contracted to the point where it almost matched the FORT's vision. The second division was abandoned at the start of 1989, and by 1991 there were only twelve teams remaining in the Association: ten were among the twelve clubs named by the FORT, with excluded clubs Springvale and Werribee surviving in place of Geelong West and the proposed Ringwood club. However, the VFL's national expansion and rationalisation of its Victorian clubs did not progress as far or as quickly as FORT had speculated: by 1994, all eleven Victorian clubs were still competing in the League, and only one new interstate club, the Adelaide Crows, had joined; and even as late as 2020 there were still ten Victorian clubs and only eight interstate clubs. The Association ended up becoming the top Victorian state-level competition following an administrative change in 1995, but it was not until 2000, a full thirteen years after the review, that the Association finally fulfilled the FORT's vision of merging with the League reserves.

Club suspensions
Three clubs were suspended from the Association at different stages during the year: Moorabbin, Geelong West and Caulfield.

Moorabbin
On Thursday 23 April, three days before Round 3, Moorabbin coach Graham Stewart resigned from the club over a number of disagreements with the board. The exact nature of the disagreements was not widely publicised, but they covered a range of areas in the management of the club and team, including player payments. Ten senior players immediately walked out in support of Stewart.

Lacking players willing to play, the club forfeited its Round 3 games against Oakleigh in all three grades. The Association issued an ultimatum to Moorabbin that if it could not field a team in all three grades, it would be suspended from the competition. Former Oakleigh premiership player Tom Quinn was appointed coach on 29 April, but the club was unable to coax enough players back, and it forfeited its Round 4 matches against Sunshine. As such, on 6 May, the Association executive committee suspended Moorabbin from the firsts and Seconds competitions for the remainder of the season; the rest of Moorabbin's games were treated as forfeitures. The club ultimately never sought readmission to the competition in 1988, and folded, bringing to an end a brief tenure of just over four seasons in the Association.

Geelong West
Although it was identified as one of the future Division 1 clubs under the FORT's proposal, Geelong West had been in decline throughout the 1980s. By 1987, the three local Corio District football leagues – the GFL, GDFL and BFL – were held in higher regard within Geelong than the Association was, meaning that local clubs attracted larger crowds and better sponsorship and could offer higher player payments than Geelong West. Additionally, many Geelong-based players preferred to play a Saturday afternoon game locally, rather than play a Sunday afternoon game and be required to travel to Melbourne every second week. Geelong West's minor grades had been suffering the consequences of this for many years – the thirds in particular had been routinely thrashed by more than 300 points since the early 1980s – but by 1987 the senior team was also suffering. After six weeks, the club was sitting winless in last place, was struggling to draw crowds and was in a poor financial position.

On Friday 29 May, the Geelong West playing group forfeited its Round 7 games in all three grades, seeking to make a highly public gesture to call attention to the club's ailing viability and lack of players. It was also speculated and reported that the players were striking over $15,000 in match payments collectively owed to the group at the time; it was confirmed that this money was owing, but the players denied this was the motivation for the forfeiture. The players had reportedly been planning the boycott for about a month before enacting it. The following week, a public appeal began to raise money for and encourage local players to play for the club, using the club's position as one of the city's most historically successful local clubs over a period of more than 100 years to gain support. On June 10, the Association intervened: it gave the club until 30 June to prove that it was financially viable and could reliably field teams in all three grades, or it would face suspension for the rest of the year; and, the club was provisionally suspended until it could prove those two things.

The club's public appeal was successful in raising funds, and players including former Geelong West champions Joe Radojevic, Warwick Yates and Sylvester Kranjc were willing to play with the club to help it survive, even if it meant playing games on consecutive days: for their local clubs on Saturday and for Geelong West on Sunday. The final impediment was that a special transfer agreement needed to be signed between the Association and the local leagues to enable those players to make the weekly transfer between clubs beyond the normal transfer deadline of 30 June; this was agreed to, Geelong West's suspension was lifted, and the club returned to competition in Round 10.

Geelong West drew with second-placed Frankston in its first game back to gain its first points for the year, but it went on to win only one more game and was relegated at the end of the year. The club lasted one more season in the Association, before withdrawing after the 1988 season.

Caulfield
In the final round of the home-and-away season, Sunshine was scheduled to play Caulfield in the Association's first ever Friday night game at the newly upgraded Skinner Reserve. At the same time, as a result of its financial difficulties, Caulfield had fallen behind on its affiliation levies, owing the Association $8,125 (including fines) after missing payments in July and August; the club had no cash reserves with which to pay, and the Association indicated in the week leading up to the match that the club faced suspension as a result. The Association Board of Management determined that the Friday night match would go ahead, and that it would meet the following week to determine whether or not to suspend Caulfield; but, that it would reserve the right to apply a suspension retroactively, potentially stripping Caulfield of any points it might earn against Sunshine. Caulfield responded that it would not play the game unless the Association guaranteed that it would not apply a retroactive suspension; the Association did not give this assurance, so Caulfield forfeited the game, and was fined $1,500 as a result. Sunshine, which was angry with Caulfield after having invested money promoting the game, staged a match between the firsts and Seconds on the Friday night instead. Caulfield never played another Association game, as it was later suspended for the 1988 season, which ultimately ended the club's time in the Association.

Division 1
The Division 1 home-and-away season was played over eighteen rounds; the top four then contested the finals under the Page–McIntyre system. The finals were played at the Junction Oval.

Clubs who won on forfeit were awarded a win and four premiership points, credited with the round's average winning score as 'points for', and debited the round's average losing score as 'points against'. The ladder as it is shown here distinguishes wins by forfeiture from wins in completed matches, but not all sources make this distinction.

Ladder

Finals

Awards
The leading goalkicker for the season was Ben Weatherald (Coburg), who kicked 73 goals during the home-and-away season and did not participate in finals.
The J. J. Liston Trophy was won by Barry Round (Williamstown), who polled 19 votes; Round became the first player to win both a Brownlow Medal and a Liston Trophy since Des Fothergill in 1940 and 1941 respectively. Round finished ahead of: Mick Jennings (Port Melbourne), who was second with 17 votes; Mark Whitzell (Port Melbourne), who also polled 17 votes but was ineligible; and John Favier (Frankston), who was third with 16 votes.
Preston won the seconds premiership. Preston 14.19 (103) defeated Brunswick 8.11 (59) in the Grand Final, held on Sunday 20 September.

Division 2
The Division 2 home-and-away season was played over eighteen rounds; the top four then contested the finals under the Page–McIntyre system. The finals were played at Junction Oval.

Clubs who won on forfeit were awarded a win and four premiership points, credited with the round's average winning score as 'points for', and debited the round's average losing score as 'points against'. The ladder as it is shown here distinguishes wins by forfeiture from wins in completed matches, but not all sources make this distinction.

Ladder

Finals

Awards
The leading goalkicker for Division 2 was Rino Pretto (Oakleigh), who kicked 96 goals in the home-and-away season and did not participate in finals.
The J. Field Medal was won by Peter Rogerson (Waverley), who polled 19 votes. Rogerson finished ahead of Luke Soulos (Prahran), who polled 16 votes. Votes won in the matches played against Moorabbin were excluded from the count.
Werribee won the seconds premiership. Werribee 17.14 (116) defeated Dandenong 13.11 (89) in the Grand Final, played on Sunday 20 September.

Notable events

Interleague matches
In 1987, the Association competed in and won the NFL Shield, the NFL's interstate competition among the minor states. It was the first time the Association had contested an NFL-sanctioned interstate event since its expulsion from the ANFC/NFL in 1970; the Association held a competition membership, but not a full membership, of the NFL at this time. Terry Wheeler (Williamstown) was coach of the team; Jeff Sarau (Frankston) was the captain, with Barry Round (Williamstown) stepping up in Sarau's absence against Queensland.

The Grand final against Tasmania was delayed for 35 minutes, because heavy fog prevented the Tasmanian team's flight from landing in Melbourne.

Other notable events
Mitsubishi Motors withdrew as the major sponsor of the Association at the beginning of the year, and was replaced by ANA Friendly Society.
Network Ten permanently ended its coverage of Association football at the end of the previous season. The ABC signed a deal to televise the Division 1 second semi-final, preliminary final and Grand Final in 1987.
By 1987, the VFL was staging Sunday matches in Victoria on an increasingly regular basis, and some smaller Association clubs had suffered over previous years by losing fans to local Saturday competitions. As a result, Association clubs were given the option of playing games on Saturdays instead of Sundays from 1987: Berwick and Werribee both experimented with Saturday games during the season. This heralded the beginning of the end of the Association's time as a dedicated Sunday competition.

See also
List of VFA/VFL premiers

References

Victorian Football League seasons
VFL